Chen Ching-min (born 2 May 1966) is a Taiwanese nurse and politician. The American Academy of Nursing and the Royal College of Surgeons in Ireland have awarded her fellowship. Politically, Chen is a member of the Democratic Progressive Party and has served as an appointed at-large member of the Legislative Yuan twice, from 2018 to 2020, and from 2022.

Early life and nursing career
Chen was born in Taipei on 2 May 1966. Her father , brother , and niece  are politicians. Chen's elder sister was a nurse, and inspired her to pursue the vocation. Chen completed a bachelor's degree in nursing at the University of Illinois Chicago in 1990, then graduated from Indiana University School of Nursing with a doctorate. After completing her doctorate in 2007, Chen became a professor at Taipei Medical University, where she established the School of Geriatric Nursing and Care Management that same year. Chen subsequently joined the National Cheng Kung University faculty in 2011. While serving as a legislator, Chen retained her position as deputy director of the Taiwan Nurses Association. In 2019, she was elected a fellow of the American Academy of Nursing. 

After completing her partial term on the ninth Legislative Yuan, Chen resumed a professorship within the nursing department at the National Cheng Kung University. Chen has written a number of editorials on health-related topics, which were published in the Taipei Times. Chen became the first Taiwanese nurse to be named a fellow of the Royal College of Surgeons in Ireland in 2022.

Political career
Chen was placed on the Democratic Progressive Party proportional representation party list for the 2016 legislative elections, but not elected to office. However, Chen was appointed an at-large member of the Legislative Yuan on 9 November 2018, succeeding Chen Chi-mai, who resigned his legislative seat to contest the 2018 Kaohsiung mayoral election. While serving as a legislator, Chen advocated for Taiwanese healthcare professionals to join international medical organizations so Taiwanese could increase their participation at the 72nd World Health Assembly. She also drew attention to a Chinese health official's actions toward a Taiwanese participant at the July 2019 meeting of the International Council of Nurses, in which the Chinese delegate flipped the Taiwanese representative's name badge over, to cover the flag of the Republic of China. She ranked seventeenth on the 2020 party list, and was not reelected. Following the election of Chou Chun-mi as Magistrate of Pingtung County, Chen was reappointed to the Legislative Yuan.

References

21st-century Taiwanese women politicians
Members of the 9th Legislative Yuan
Academic staff of the National Cheng Kung University
Living people
Party List Members of the Legislative Yuan
Taiwanese women nurses
Indiana University–Purdue University Indianapolis alumni
Democratic Progressive Party Members of the Legislative Yuan
Fellows of the American Academy of Nursing
Taiwanese expatriates in the United States
Politicians of the Republic of China on Taiwan from Taipei
Taipei Medical University alumni
1966 births
University of Illinois Chicago alumni
Fellows of the Royal College of Surgeons in Ireland